"Self Made Man" is a song recorded by American country music duo Montgomery Gentry.  It was released in April 2000 as the fourth single from the album Tattoos & Scars.  The song reached #31 on the Billboard Hot Country Singles & Tracks chart.  The song was written by Wynn Varble and Jay Knowles.

Content 
The song's subject matter is about how, although a range of factors can be blamed for one's successes and failures, ultimately it is oneself that is to blame for both.

Critical reception
A review in Billboard was positive, contrasting the song with the "hillbilly bluster" of their previous singles while also praising the "regret" in Eddie Montgomery's vocal delivery.

Chart performance

References

2000 singles
1999 songs
Montgomery Gentry songs
Songs written by Jay Knowles
Songs written by Wynn Varble
Columbia Records singles